This page lists members of the New York State Legislature who have: (a) forfeited their seats due to felony convictions or pleas of guilty to felony charges; (b) been expelled from office by votes of their peers; or (c) been censured.

Legal authority and procedure
Under New York Public Officers Law Section 30(1)(e), a member of the State Legislature forfeits his seat upon "his conviction of a felony, or a crime involving a violation of his oath of office".

In People ex rel. McDonald v. Keeler, 99 N.Y. 463, 481 (1885), the New York Court of Appeals held that the New York Constitution, "like many state constitutions, does not explicitly enumerate the 'power to keep order or to punish members or others for disorderly conduct, or to expel a member'". Nevertheless, the Keeler Court added that "'[t]he necessity of the powers mentioned is apparent, and is conceded in all authorities'". Furthermore, Section Three of the New York Legislative Law (adopted in 1892) provides that each house of the state legislature "has the power to expel any of its members, after the report of a committee to inquire into the charges against him shall have been made". Expulsion has not been a common form of sanction used by the Legislature.

In addition to expulsion, other sanctions that the Legislature has used to discipline its own members include censure and removal of privileges (e.g. committee chairships).

The Report of the New York State Senate Select Committee to Investigate the Facts and Circumstances Surrounding the Conviction of Hiram Monserrate on October 15, 2009 contains a lengthy legal analysis of the disciplinary authority of the New York State Senate and the New York State Assembly vis-à-vis their respective members.

History
In 1779, New York State Senator and militia Colonel John Williams was expelled from the Senate during the American Revolution. Williams was accused of filing false muster and payrolls for the militia regiment he commanded in order to profit personally, and of withholding pay from soldiers fined at courts martial that were not sanctioned by militia regulations. (Williams was later exonerated and promoted to Brigadier General. He also served subsequent terms in the Assembly and the Senate, and in the United States Congress.)

In 1861, New York State Assemblymember Jay Gibbons was expelled due to attempts to garner bribes in exchange for his vote.

In 1892, Senators George Z. Erwin, Charles T. Saxton, and Edmund O'Connor were censured by the Senate after they had refused to vote on a specific bill before the legislative body. In 1920, five members of the Assembly were expelled because they were members of the Socialist Party; the Legislature ruled that they could not be "consistent and loyal" due to their allegiances.

In February 2010, Democratic Senator Hiram Monserrate became the first member of the Legislature to be expelled in over 80 years. Monserrate had been convicted of misdemeanor assault in 2009 in connection with acts of domestic violence. Monserrate contested the Senate's action in federal court, but the sanction was upheld.

List

See also

 First Red Scare
 List of members of the New York State Assembly
 List of New York State Senators
 List of United States senators expelled or censured
 Majority Leader of the New York State Senate
 Politics of New York (state)
 Socialist Party of America

Notes

References

Further reading

External links
Official site of the New York Senate
Official site of the New York Assembly

New York State Legislature
 
 
Political scandals in New York (state)
L Legislature members expelled or censured